Malacosoma is a genus of moths in the family Lasiocampidae first described by Jacob Hübner in 1820.

Species
Malacosoma alpicolum (Staudinger, 1870)
Malacosoma americanum (Fabricius, 1793)
Malacosoma californicum (Packard, 1864)
Malacosoma castrense (Linnaeus, 1758)
Malacosoma constrictum (H. Edwards, 1874)
Malacosoma disstria (Hübner, [1820])
Malacosoma franconicum (Denis & Schiffermüller, 1775)
Malacosoma incurva (H. Edwards, 1882)
Malacosoma laurae (Lajonquuière, 1977)
Malacosoma luteum (Oberthür, 1878)
Malacosoma neustria (Linnaeus, 1758)
Malacosoma parallellum (Staudinger, 1887)
Malacosoma primum (Staudinger, 1887)
Malacosoma tigris (Dyar, 1902)

References

 
Lasiocampinae